Cymbaeremaeidae is a family of oribatids in the order Oribatida. There are about 5 genera and at least 90 described species in Cymbaeremaeidae.

Genera
 Bulleremaeus Hammer, 1966
 Cymbaeremaeus Berlese, 1896
 Glanderemaeus Balogh & Csiszár, 1963
 Scapheremaeus Berlese, 1910
 Seteremaeus Hammer, 1971

References

Further reading

 
 
 
 

Acariformes
Acari families